Battleford was a provincial electoral district for the Legislative Assembly of Saskatchewan, Canada. It was one of the 25 ridings created when the province came into existence in 1905.  It was replaced before the 1917 general election, by the riding of Cut Knife and by combining the eastern tip of the riding with the North Battleford provincial district to create The Battlefords.

Member of the Legislative Assembly

Election results

|-

|style="width: 150px"|Provincial Rights
|Robert Ferguson Chisholm
|align="right"|588
|align="right"|39.14
|align="right"|-
|- bgcolor="white"
!align="left" colspan=3|Total
!align="right"|1,502
!align="right"|100.00
!align="right"|

|-

|style="width: 150px"|Provincial Rights
|Archibald Cameron Dewar
|align="right"|793
|align="right"|46.51
|align="right"|+7.36
|- bgcolor="white"
!align="left" colspan=3|Total
!align="right"|1,705
!align="right"|100.00
!align="right"|

|-

|style="width: 150px"|Conservative
|Robert Ovens
|align="right"|338
|align="right"|37.30
|align="right"|-9.20
|- bgcolor="white"
!align="left" colspan=3|Total
!align="right"|906
!align="right"|100.00
!align="right"|

See also
Electoral district (Canada)
List of Saskatchewan provincial electoral districts
List of Saskatchewan general elections
List of political parties in Saskatchewan

References
 Saskatchewan Archives Board: Saskatchewan Executive and Legislative Directory

Former provincial electoral districts of Saskatchewan